Trichur Heart Hospital is a 500-bed speciality hospital situated in Thrissur, Kerala, India. The hospital is equipped with most modern cardiac catheterisation lab ensuring detailed study of chambers, valves, coronary arteries, and blood flow details. The hospital specializes in neurology, general medicine, general surgery, orthopedics, gynecology, anaesthesiology, neonatology, pathology and histopathology, dermatology and physiotherapy.

History
The hospital's foundation stone was laid on 7 February 1986. Later on 28 October 1992, former President of India, Sankar Dayal Sharma inaugurated the first phase of the hospital.

External links
Official website of Trichur Heart Hospital

Hospital buildings completed in 1992
Hospitals established in 1992
Hospitals in Thrissur
1992 establishments in Kerala
20th-century architecture in India